, the Gerontology Research Group (GRG) had validated the longevity claims of 154 British citizens who have become "supercentenarians", attaining or surpassing 110 years of age. This number including 23 emigrants who died in other nations. The oldest known British person ever is Charlotte Hughes, who died in 1993 at the age of 115 years and 228 days. The oldest man ever from the United Kingdom is Henry Allingham, who died in 2009 at the age of 113 years and 42 days.

100 oldest British people ever

Biographies

Betsy Baker 
Betsy Baker (August 20, 1842 – October 24, 1955) was born Betsy Ann Russell in Great Brington, England, immigrated to the United States, settled in Nebraska, and became the world's oldest person. She lived for 65 years in Johnson County, where she was called "the Queen mother of the Johnson County Fair" in 1953. At age 107, she received a congratulatory letter from president Harry S. Truman. On her 112th birthday, she was featured in the US Army magazine Stars and Stripes. She died in Tecumseh, aged 113 years and 65 days.

Baker was the first supercentenarian listed by Guinness World Records as the world's oldest person. In 2002, researchers confirmed that she had been the world's oldest living person by modern verification standards for an unknown period of time prior to her death in 1955. She was the second well-documented person in the world to have reached the age of 113, after Delina Filkins.

Lucy Jane Askew 
Lucy Jane Askew (8 September 1883 – 9 December 1997) was the oldest person in Europe at the time of her death, aged 114 years and 92 days. She was born in Loughton, Essex, to Arthur George Askew and Susan Elizabeth Askew née Ellis. Her parents were prosperous cartage contractors, cab proprietors, and landowners. She had five siblings, of whom three also lived past 100. Askew lived all her life in Loughton, and never married. She was a devout Christian, attending the Loughton Union Church. She moved into a nursing home at 106 and survived a leg operation at 108. She remained in good health and died peacefully in her sleep. She attributed her longevity to a modest lifestyle.

Edith Ingamells 
Edith 'Judy' Ingamells (née Gude;  12 January 1894 – 1 March 2006) was the oldest person in the United Kingdom from December 2005 to March 2006. She was born in Maidenhead, Berkshire, to George and Harriet Gude. According to census documents, George worked as a photographer in 1901 and a public caterer in 1911. She moved to Enfield, London, at the beginning of the First World War in 1914, and married Percy Ingamells, a wholesale florist. They had three daughters, born between 1915 and 1925. Ingamells lived in other areas around England, and worked as a milliner before settling back in Enfield in 1990.

Her daughter, Patricia Bull, said, at the time of Ingemells' 111th birthday, that the secret of her longevity was to "never look back, always look forward, which she is certainly doing".

Notes

References 

 
British
Supercentenarians.